Preclearance is the United States Department of Homeland Security's (DHS) practice of operating prescreening border control facilities at airports and other ports of departure located outside of the United States pursuant to agreements between the United States and host countries. Travelers are subject to immigration and customs inspections by Customs and Border Protection (CBP) officers before boarding their transportation onward to the United States. Preclearance applies to all passengers regardless of their nationality or purpose of travel. Upon arrival, precleared passengers arrive in the United States as domestic travelers, but may still be subject to re-inspection at the discretion of CBP. This process is intended to streamline border procedures, reduce congestion at American ports of entry, and facilitate travel into airports that otherwise lack immigration and customs processing facilities for commercial flights.

The history of inspecting U.S.-bound passengers in foreign countries began in 1894, when American immigration inspectors were deployed to sea ports in Canada. Modern preclearance facilities were first introduced in 1952 at Malton Airport (now Toronto Pearson International Airport) and Calgary International Airport under an informal arrangement with the government of Canada and are now available at eight major Canadian airports and one seaport, while several other seaports and one rail station in British Columbia have "pre-inspection" facilities for screening immigration admissibility only. Preclearance facilities also exist in airports in Aruba, the Bahamas, Bermuda, Ireland, and the United Arab Emirates.

Reasons for implementation
The preclearance program aims to streamline border procedures for flights entering the United States, reduce congestion at ports of entry, and to facilitate travel into U.S. airports that may not be equipped to otherwise handle international travelers. Although more U.S. airports have expanded or introduced customs facilities since the preclearance program began, LaGuardia Airport and Ronald Reagan Washington National Airport remain the two largest U.S. airports without customs facilities for processing commercial flights.

Preclearance programs have been accused of being motivated by a desire to prevent the arrival of asylum seekers, who are otherwise protected under the 1951 Refugee Convention's provisions on non-refoulement once they arrive at their destination.

Implementation

After the requisite legal agreements have been executed, a foreign airport implementing preclearance for the first time must undergo significant remodeling or must build an entirely new facility to support the process.  The foreign airport is responsible for providing CBP with a suitable inspection facility based upon the agency's detailed design guidelines.  CBP preclearance facilities are smaller than their domestic counterparts on the basis that departing passengers typically enter airports at slower and more constant rates, in contrast to arriving passengers who emerge from newly-landed aircraft by the hundreds all at once.  

Preclearance requires considerable resources and a great deal of redundancy from the foreign airports which choose to implement it.  Once precleared, U.S.-bound passengers are kept in a separate sterile waiting area equipped with its own shops, restaurants, lounges, restrooms, and other passenger services, as well as its own gates exclusively devoted to U.S.-bound aircraft.  The foreign airport is responsible for providing all of this, meaning that the airport must already have significant U.S. air traffic to justify the expense (or anticipates development of such traffic in the near future).  The only cost that is typically shared between CBP and the host airport is the cost of CBP personnel who are deployed abroad to staff preclearance facilities.

Benefits and drawbacks

Preclearance is particularly beneficial to those who have an ongoing connection (such as a connecting flight) upon arrival in the United States, as there is no risk of border delays causing them to miss such a connection. A corresponding drawback, however, is that a delay in preclearance could cause the passenger to miss the outbound flight. 

Precleared air travelers with further connections enjoy the convenience of having their baggage checked through to their next destination.  Like connecting domestic passengers, they disembark into the sterile area or airside of the airport and may walk directly to their next gate.  Behind the scenes, the Transportation Security Administration rescreens precleared checked baggage at its first airport in the United States before allowing its transfer to connecting flights. 
 
Connecting international passengers who have not been precleared must first undergo immigration inspection (primary inspection), then collect their checked baggage, walk their baggage through customs inspection (secondary inspection), exit to the landside of the airport, recheck their baggage for connecting flights, pass through security screening to reenter the sterile area of the airport (because certain items allowed in checked baggage cannot be brought into the sterile area), and then proceed to their gates for their connecting flights.  

Another advantage is that CBP officers are able to exclude inadmissible passengers and prohibited goods before a flight, train journey, or voyage commences. This saves CBP the difficulty of dealing with them on U.S. soil and helps to minimize the risk of untoward incidents happening there. An alien who is denied entry into the United States at a preclearance facility may not board the U.S.-bound flight, so CBP does not need to deal with making deportation arrangements. The passenger may exit the airport and return home (unless the passenger arrived at the preclearance airport from an earlier flight). While serving as Secretary of Homeland Security, Jeh Johnson explained this in September 2014 to the Council on Foreign Relations: "To use a football metaphor, I'd much rather defend our end zone from the 50-yard-line than from our 1-yard-line".

Preclearance also provides considerable flexibility to the airlines operating in those routes where such a program is available. For example, major U.S. airlines and their subsidiaries routinely operate many daily flights from locations like Toronto or Nassau to New York City. The presence of preclearance facilities in Toronto and Nassau enables airlines to conveniently direct their flights from those airports to land at LaGuardia Airport (which has no border protection facilities) instead of John F. Kennedy International Airport (JFK) or Newark Liberty International Airport (EWR), thereby allowing them to save valuable landing slots at JFK and EWR for other international arrivals from overseas airports which lack CBP preclearance facilities.

Preclearance exists at most major Canadian airports, theoretically enabling more convenient travel from those cities to the United States. However, the waits at some busy preclearance facilities, notably Toronto Pearson (the busiest U.S. preclearance facility), can often exceed the waiting times for processing passengers from non-precleared flights at destination airports and cause significant delays to departure schedules. With the notable exceptions of LaGuardia Airport and Ronald Reagan Washington National Airport, many U.S. airports now have more customs facilities compared to when the preclearance program first started in 1952. Airport authorities have blamed these delays on reduced staffing levels by CBP, but pleas for increased staffing have been answered with deferrals due to domestic priorities. NEXUS and similar programs are now being explored and expanded as a means to try to restore some of the original convenience to the preclearance process.

CBP also sets the hours of operation of its preclearance facilities, which often tend to be shorter than the operating hours of the airports, seaports, or railway stations they operate in. Transportation operators who would like to allow their passengers to be able to take advantage of such a facility must schedule their departure times to coincide with the preclearance facilities' operating hours. Carriers may launch flights from preclearance airports to the U.S. outside CBP preclearance operating hours, but passengers who choose to take such flights will be processed in the same way as most other international passengers upon arrival on American soil.

Legal restrictions
Preclearance facilities exist because of agreements made between the U.S. federal government and the governments of the host countries. Travelers who have passed through preclearance facilities, but whose flight or ship has not departed, remain in the legal jurisdiction of the host country. U.S. officials may question and search travelers with such passengers' permission. Their power to arrest or detain travelers (such as for customs or immigration violations or outstanding warrants) is limited; for example, in Ireland, a preclearance officer may detain a person whom they reasonably suspect to be carrying a weapon and search the person, or may detain someone whom they reasonably suspect to have committed an indictable offence under Irish law or have obstructed the preclearance officer in the performance of their duties. Anyone so detained must be delivered forthwith to the Garda Síochána to be dealt with in accordance with Irish law.

Some countries have laws in place that specifically cover preclearance issues. If a CBP officer has any security but non-immigration/customs-related concerns about a traveler, the attending CBP officer may need to refer the matter to local officials.  Passengers can choose to abandon their flight and refuse search, and unlike in the United States, officers cannot search them without permission absent an immediate threat. Most preclearance facilities have a sign explaining so. CBP Officers in the Preclearance Division are not armed on foreign soil. However, since the Parliament of Canada approved Bill C-23, CBP officers would be allowed to carry sidearms on duty in Canada if they are working in an environment in which Canada Border Services Agency (CBSA) officers are normally armed.

Canada

History
The precursor of U.S. preclearance operation began in 1894, when the U.S. government entered into agreements with Canadian steamship and railroad operators to place U.S. immigration inspectors at four largest Canadian seaports of Montreal, Quebec City, Halifax, Nova Scotia and Saint John, New Brunswick, to inspect prospective immigrants seeking to enter the U.S. via the northern land border. Prior to this arrangement, immigrants entering via the northern border were usually uninspected as the U.S. had no immigration inspection facilities on its side of the border, thus their arrivals were not entered into records. After the arrangement came into force, prospective immigrants would first pass Canadian quarantine and then be inspected by U.S. immigration inspectors as if they were entering via a U.S. port of entry. Once admitted, they would be given documentation to physically cross the land border by train within 30 days without additional inspection. In 1903, the arrangement, now formally named "pre-inspection" by the U.S. Bureau of Immigration, was extended to Victoria, British Columbia for U.S.-bound travelers before boarding their ship to destinations in Washington state. "Pre-inspection" posts in Eastern Canada lasted until the mid-20th century, with the last passenger manifest concluded in 1954, while Victoria's "pre-inspection" location remains in operation.

The modern form of air preclearance began as an informal agreement between the two countries at Malton Airport (now Toronto Pearson International Airport) and Calgary International Airport in 1952, following a request from American Airlines. Over 250,000 passengers were processed in the first year, and another preclearance facility began operation at Dorval Airport (now Montreal-Trudeau International Airport) in 1957. By 1970, the three ports of entry were processing over 3 million passengers annually. To meet growing demands, preclearance was extended to Vancouver and Winnipeg international airports in 1979, Edmonton International Airport in 1982, Ottawa Macdonald-Cartier International Airport in 1997, and Halifax Stanfield International Airport in 2006.

In 1974, preclearance operations became formalized under domestic Canadian law with the passage of the Air Transport Preclearance Act. The arrangement was repeatedly modernized with the 1999 Preclearance Act, and with the 2001 Canada–U.S. Agreement on Air Transport Preclearance. In 2019, previous agreements and legislations were replaced by the Agreement on Land, Rail, Marine, and Air Transport Preclearance Between the Government of the United States of America and the Government of Canada (LRMA), which allows for significant expansion of the scope of preclearance facilities.

On March 16, 2015, U.S. and Canadian officials signed the ministerial-level LRMA. The agreement paved paths for the expansion of CBP’s preclearance facilities as well as its detention powers on Canadian soil to the levels similar on U.S. soil. For instance, under the LRMA, CBP officers working at preclearance facilities in Canada will be able to carry firearms and detain travelers who try to voluntarily withdraw their outbound travel or willingly leave the preclearance area. Although CBP does not have arrest powers in Canada, the bill also includes increased cooperation with the CBSA to arrest travelers found to be breaking the law. On March 10, 2016, U.S. and Canadian officials announced that the three priority transportation hubs that would receive preclearance were Billy Bishop Toronto City Airport, Québec City Jean Lesage International Airport, and Montreal Central Station.

On December 8, 2016, U.S. President Barack Obama signed the bipartisan Promoting Travel, Commerce and National Security Act of 2016 into law, completing the U.S. requirement for the ratification of the LRMA.  On December 12, 2017, Canadian Governor General Julie Payette gave royal assent to the Canadian Preclearance Act. The LRMA was formally ratified by both countries on August 15, 2019 and replaced previous treaties and Canadian legislations.

The preclearance agreement is fully reciprocal, meaning Canada is allowed to operate preclearance facilities in the United States on the same basis as U.S. facilities in Canada, including CBSA agents’ expanded powers under the LRMA. On average, however, U.S. airports offer far fewer daily flights to Canada (as a proportion of their total air traffic) compared to the reverse, making this an expensive and inefficient proposition that, has not been exercised by the Canadian government. 

In Canada, the preclearance measures interface with the Quarantine Act in the case of a public health emergency.

Air
The following Canadian airports operate U.S. preclearance facilities:

Calgary International Airport
Edmonton International Airport
Halifax Stanfield International Airport
Montréal–Trudeau International Airport
Ottawa Macdonald–Cartier International Airport
Toronto Pearson International Airport
Vancouver International Airport
Winnipeg James Armstrong Richardson International Airport

At the request of Porter Airlines, a new terminal building at Billy Bishop Toronto City Airport (Toronto Island) officially opened in Fall 2010 and includes both CBSA inspection facilities and provisions for CBP's preclearance facilities. The request to include preclearance, however, was formally denied by the Department of Homeland Security in August 2010 due to the lack of U.S.-bound passenger flow at the time. 

After the conclusion of legislative procedures by both countries in 2017, both Toronto Island Airport and Quebec City Jean Lesage International Airport were included in preclearance's expansion plans. The necessary upgrades in Quebec City were anticipated to take 18 months and C$35 million to complete, although as of 2021 there was yet a targeted completion date. In December 2021, it was announced that Toronto Island Airport's preclearance facility will become operational in 18-24 months, and the expansion will cost approximately C$20 million which has yet to be secured.

In airports with preclearance, passengers must first pass airport security inspection before they can proceed to the preclearance area. Security checks are conducted by Canadian Air Transport Security Authority (CATSA) in the standards of both CATSA and U.S. Transportation Security Administration (TSA) regulations.

Rail
There are currently no full preclearance facilities for rail passengers in Canada. Nevertheless, special operations termed "pre-inspections" have been conducted by CBP and CBSA officers at Pacific Central Station in Vancouver, British Columbia for passengers departing on the Amtrak Cascades trains to Seattle and Portland, Oregon since 1995. The "pre-inspection" procedures were enacted prior to the implementation of modern preclearance legislations, therefore only deal with immigration admissibility to the U.S., and the trains are still re-inspected by CBP for customs purposes at the border line in Blaine, Washington despite not making any further stops within Canada. In October 2019, Amtrak has requested the partial preclearance operation arrangement to be updated to full immigration and customs preclearance under the LRMA so the stop at the border can be eliminated. Amtrak estimated that the trip time will be shortened by at least 10 minutes. Amtrak suspended services on the route from March 2020 until September 2022, and no public timeline for implementation has been announced.

In May 2012, U.S. Senators Chuck Schumer (D-NY), Kirsten Gillibrand (D-NY), Patrick Leahy (D-VT), and Bernie Sanders (I-VT) sent a letter to President Barack Obama urging him to fast track the approval of a preclearance facility at Montreal Central Station, which would allow U.S.-bound travelers on Amtrak's Adirondack to bypass an existing immigration stop at Rouses Point, New York for entering the United States. This has become possible after the ratification of the LRMA in 2019. Nevertheless, there remains no timeline for the establishment of such a facility, as train services remain suspended between the two countries due to the COVID-19 pandemic.

In addition to passenger pre-inspection, the LRMA allows for U.S.-bound cargo to be precleared in Canada and vice versa. While there are no CBP cargo preclearance posts that operate in Canada , CBSA has been running a joint inspection project with CBP at Rouses Point, New York, for Canada-bound rail cargo since 2017. The project became permanent after the ratification of the LRMA in 2019.

Sea
 Prince Rupert Alaska Marine Highway System Ferry Terminal

The Alaska Marine Highway terminal in Prince Rupert, British Columbia is the only marine preclearance location in the world. It became operational on June 20, 2022 and is used by the Alaska Marine Highway ferry service to Ketchikan.

Prior to the opening of the preclearance facilitates, "pre-inspection" facilities were available for users of the Ketchikan-Prince Rupert service until the route's suspension on October 1, 2019, after the state announced that it could not unilaterally cover the cost of security service provided by Royal Canadian Mounted Police (RCMP) to unarmed CBP officers which has become mandatory under the LRMA. However, both Canadian and Alaskan governments announced in September 2021 that they would work to upgrade Prince Rupert's facility for the port to become the first seaport preclearance location by the time of the route's resumption in mid-2022, which would alleviate the need for RCMP presence as CBP officers would be able to legally carry firearms.

Aside from the sole preclearance operation, CBP also operates several "pre-inspection" posts at the port of Victoria, British Columbia for both the Black Ball Line's MV Coho car ferry service to Port Angeles, Washington and the Victoria Clipper passenger-only ferry to Seattle; and the same program operates at the terminal in Sidney, British Columbia for Washington State Ferries' Anacortes–San Juan Islands ferry service to Anacortes, Washington. Another U.S. "pre-inspection" post is also located at the Port of Vancouver. This post is particularly valuable to travelers on cruise liners that visit Alaska or that depart from Vancouver and have a first stop at U.S. cities situated along the west coast of North America.

Similar to the operations for trains, all "pre-inspected" passengers are subject to customs inspections at U.S. ports. In 1999, U.S. Customs agents at the Port Angeles, Washington checkpoint successfully intercepted Algerian terrorist Ahmed Ressam and foiled his plot to bomb Los Angeles International Airport after Ressam has passed immigration inspection in Victoria, British Columbia.

Caribbean and Atlantic Ocean
Aruba: Queen Beatrix International Airport 
Bahamas: Lynden Pindling International Airport in Nassau
Bermuda: L.F. Wade International Airport

In 1970, the U.S. government opened its first preclearance location outside Canada at Bermuda's L.F. Wade International Airport. In January 1974, the facility became formalized with the conclusion of the preclearance treaty. In April of that year, the U.S. signed a similar treaty with the Bahamas, which allows for preclearance facilities to be opened at Lynden Pindling International Airport in Nassau the same year and Grand Bahama International Airport in Freeport in 1978. In 1994, an agreement with the Aruban government was concluded, and preclearance began operation at Queen Beatrix International Airport.

In early 2022, the U.S. government signaled that the preclearance facility at Grand Bahama International Airport of Freeport would be closed due to delays in the airport's reconstruction following its acquisition by the Bahamian government. The preclearance facility was formally closed on October 11, 2022.

Plans were underway for a preclearance facility to be opened at Punta Cana International Airport, located in the popular tourist destination of Punta Cana, Dominican Republic, to be operating by the end of summer 2009. Further plans were made in April 2016 to open a facility the next year; but as of March 2018, the facility had not yet opened. In April 2011, a team from the U.S. Department of Homeland Security traveled to Jamaica for talks with Jamaican government and tourism officials on opening future preclearance facilities on the island.

Ireland
 Dublin Airport
 Shannon Airport

The United States and Ireland entered into a preinspection arrangement in 1986 and a new preclearance treaty in 2009. The "pre-inspection" facility became operational at Shannon Airport in 1988 and at Dublin Airport in 1994.

Initially, both airports only offered "pre-inspection" immigration inspection, while customs and agriculture inspections were still done upon arrival in the United States, which required passengers to go through international arrival areas after landing. In August 2009, Shannon opened an addition to its "pre-inspection" facility to allow full preclearance inspections. In January 2011, a section of the then-recently opened Terminal 2 of Dublin Airport was opened with dedicated preclearance with full CBP facilities. Both airports now allow U.S.-bound commercial flights that use the preclearance facilities to arrive at domestic terminals instead of international terminals, which in turn allows arriving passengers to leave U.S. airports upon landing without further inspection. Since March 2010, the Shannon preclearance facility is also available for use by private aircraft. However, the Dublin facility is only available for commercial flights.

In 2017, U.S. Executive Order 13769 implemented a ban on passport-holders of seven countries, preventing traveling to the United States. In response, the Irish government announced that there would be a "complete review" of preclearance arrangements.

United Arab Emirates

In December 2011, the government of Abu Dhabi signed a letter of intent to construct a terminal that, when opened, would house a U.S. border preclearance facility.

Several U.S. lawmakers opposed the Abu Dhabi preclearance facility because only state-owned Etihad Airways flies from Abu Dhabi to U.S. destinations. On June 6, 2013, the U.S. House passed an amendment offered by Representatives Pat Meehan (R-PA), Candice Miller (R-MI) and Peter DeFazio (D-OR), which prohibits the U.S. Department of Homeland Security (DHS) from using any taxpayer dollars to conduct Customs and Border Protection (CBP) preclearance operations at Abu Dhabi International Airport. The amendment was unanimously adopted during floor consideration of the FY14 Homeland Security Appropriations bill. On November 14, 2013, Rep. Patrick Meehan (R, PA-7) introduced the Preclearance Authorization Act of 2014 (H.R. 3488; 113th Congress). Meehan indicated that the goal of the bill would be to prevent CBP from opening a preclearance facility at Abu Dhabi International Airport in the United Arab Emirates. Supporters of the bill wished to avoid giving Etihad an unfair competitive advantage created by the fact that travelers flying through Abu Dhabi (on Etihad) would be able to use preclearance, while passengers on other airlines would not. This bill did not become law.

The preclearance facility at Abu Dhabi International Airport was officially opened on January 26, 2014.

List
Each preclearance port has a distinct, three-letter port of entry code. The list of codes is maintained by CBP and may be different from the IATA and ICAO airport codes of each airport. These codes can be commonly found on passport entry stamps or parole stamps.

Future plans
On March 16, 2015, the United States and Canada signed an agreement to construct a preclearance facility at Montreal Central Station. The facility would eliminate a border stop for Amtrak's Adirondack service and would support a future extension of the Vermonter to Montreal.

In May 2015, the United States Department of Homeland Security announced that the following airports will be considered for the expansion of the border preclearance scheme:

 Brussels Airport, Belgium
 Punta Cana Airport, Dominican Republic
 Narita International Airport, Japan
 Amsterdam Airport Schiphol, Netherlands
 Oslo Airport, Norway
 Madrid-Barajas Airport, Spain
 Stockholm Arlanda Airport, Sweden
 Istanbul Atatürk Airport, Turkey
 London Heathrow Airport, United Kingdom
 Manchester Airport, United Kingdom

On November 4, 2016, Sweden and the United States signed an agreement that would make Sweden the second European country, after Ireland, to offer preclearance, although no announcement has been made as to when the service will start. On that same date, DHS also announced that eleven more airports in nine countries had been added to the list of possible preclearance airports:

 El Dorado International Airport (BOG) in Bogota, Colombia
 Ministro Pistarini International Airport (EZE) in Buenos Aires, Argentina
 Edinburgh Airport (EDI) in Edinburgh, United Kingdom
 Keflavik International Airport (KEF) in Iceland
 Mexico City International Airport (MEX) in Mexico City, Mexico
 Milan-Malpensa Airport (MXP) in Milan, Italy
 Kansai International Airport (KIX) in Osaka, Japan
 Rio de Janeiro-Galeão International Airport (GIG) in Rio de Janeiro, Brazil
 Leonardo da Vinci-Fiumicino Airport (FCO) in Rome, Italy
 São Paulo-Guarulhos International Airport (GRU) in São Paulo, Brazil
 Princess Juliana International Airport (SXM) in St. Maarten.

On 23 March 2018, the Taiwanese newspaper Liberty Times reported that the U.S. had conditionally agreed to the establishment of a border preclearance system in Taiwan. The Taiwanese government is assessing the possibility of establishing a United States border preclearance system at its main airport, and according to Ministry of Foreign Affairs (MOFA) spokesman Andrew Lee,  the relevant government ministries are examining the issue and discussing how such a system could be put in place at Taiwan Taoyuan International Airport.

On 18 August 2019, outgoing U.S. Ambassador to Colombia Kevin Whitaker stated that U.S. preclearance at El Dorado International Airport would be available within the next year, according to an interview with El Tiempo.

Aborted plans
In the early 2010s, the Ministry of Foreign Affairs of South Korea stated that the government of South Korea plans to introduce preclearance at Incheon International Airport. However, on January 15, 2015, the airport announced that it would not introduce preclearance, as an in-depth analysis concluded that preclearance could lead to decreased sales at duty-free shops despite the potential income from usage fees remitted for the use of preclearance space.

After the opening of the Abu Dhabi preclearance facility in 2014, another preclearance facility was planned for Dubai International Airport, but the plan was ultimately cancelled due to the airport's open terminal design, which makes it difficult to achieve "the level of segregation" of travelers required by the U.S. government. The Al Maktoum International Airport has incorporated designs to meet U.S. preclearance standards.

On May 23, 2015, an unofficial member of the Executive Council of Hong Kong, Regina Ip, revealed in an interview that the United States and Hong Kong had explored the possibilities "some 20 or 30 years ago" to set up the preclearance arrangements at Kai Tak Airport. According to Ip, she was dispatched by the Secretary for Security, in her capacity as a career civil servant in the Security Branch, to study the arrangements in Canada, but the plan was subsequently shelved because of room constraints at Kai Tak.

On February 1, 2017, the Netherlands pulled out of talks with the United States to set up a preclearance program at Amsterdam Airport Schiphol because of U.S. President Donald Trump's Executive Order 13769, which banned travel to the United States by citizens of certain Muslim-majority countries. On 22 June 2018, the Dutch Government made it known that they were resuming plans for a pre-clearance facility at Amsterdam Airport Schiphol.

See also
Extraterritorial jurisdiction
Immigration to the United States
List of United States immigration legislation
United States Department of Homeland Security
United States Citizenship and Immigration Services
Juxtaposed controls (a similar arrangement between Belgium, France, the Netherlands and the UK to carry out pre-embarkation immigration checks)
Woodlands Train Checkpoint (a similar arrangement where Malaysian inbound immigration checks are carried out at the station in Singapore prior to boarding)
Hong Kong West Kowloon railway station (a similar arrangement where mainland Chinese immigration checks are conducted at the railway station in Hong Kong)
Padang Besar railway station (a similar arrangement where Thai immigration checks are conducted at the railway station in Malaysia)
Shenzhen Bay Bridge (a similar arrangement where Hong Kong immigration checks are conducted on the mainland Chinese side of the border)

References

External links
 Preclearance Locations, U.S. Customs and Border Protection
   Preclearance at Toronto Pearson: A Vital Link Connecting the U.S. and Canada
 Preclearance - map of airports that have it (eSpatial interactive map)

Foreign relations of the United States
United States immigration law
Juxtaposed border controls
Border crossings of the United States